Caustic Grip is the fifth full-length studio album by Front Line Assembly, originally released on Third Mind Records in Europe and on WaxTrax! Records in the United States in 1990.

Background
The album was the first without co-founding member Michael Balch after Rhys Fulber became a full-time member of the band. Originally intended to record the successor to Gashed Senses & Crossfire together with Leeb, Balch took on tour obligations for Ministry and Revolting Cocks. Leeb decided not to wait and started working with Fulber. Fulber had already worked with Leeb on the Nerve War demo and taken part in the Gashed Senses & Crossfire tour.

Caustic Grip also marked the beginning of the long-standing collaboration with Canadian record producer Greg Reely who assumed mixing duties on the album. The recording was funded with a budget of $20,000 by Third Mind's Gary Levermore.

Release
The album was reissued by Roadrunner in 1992 and in 2003 as part of a two-disc set that also includes the Gashed Senses & Crossfire album. Up until the year 1994, when Roadrunner acquired the rights to all Third Mind releases, Caustic Grip sold about 70,000 units.

In October 2019, Canadian label Artoffact started a crowdfunding campaign in order to obtain the album licenses and to re-release the album on vinyl on May 4, 2020.

Singles
"Iceolate" is the first single taken from Caustic Grip. The single was released on August 6, 1990 through Third Mind in Europe and in the United States via Wax Trax!. Along with the original version of the title track the single contains CD-only track "Mental Distortion" and on the CD single a remix of "Iceolate". A promotional music video for "Iceolate" was created and received airplay on MTV. The track also was ranked 85 in the COMA Music Magazine feature 101 Greatest Industrial Songs of All Time.

The second single from the album was "Provision". It contains the original version of the title track as well as a remix of album track "Overkill".

Music magazine Melody Maker made both album singles single of the week in 1990.

The following single, "Virus", features a non-album track of the same name and was released on February 21, 1991 through Third Mind for Europe and by Wax Trax in the United States. It was created during the sessions for Caustic Grip. The different release formats include tracks also appearing on the album – "Provision", "Iceolate" and "Mental Distortion" – as well as remixes of "Virus", "Resist" and "Overkill".

All singles, together with the "Mindphaser" single, were re-released in 1998 on the compilation album The Singles: Four Fit through Zoth Ommog.

Reception

The single "Virus" was well received in Billboard's single reviews: "Cream of the industrial crop threatens to shatter club walls with ear-blasting sonic rave."

Track listing

Personnel

Front Line Assembly
 Bill Leeb – vocals
 Rhys Fulber

Additional musicians
 Jeff Stoddard – guitar (5)

Technical personnel
 Greg Reely – mixing
 Ken Marshall
 Steve Royea
 Christian Mumenthaler – computer images
 Sleeping Partner – design

References

Front Line Assembly albums
1990 albums
Roadrunner Records albums
Wax Trax! Records albums
Third Mind Records albums
Albums produced by Rhys Fulber